Galveston Bay Refinery, also known as Marathon Texas City Refinery, is an oil refinery operated by Marathon Petroleum within the Texas City, Texas Industrial Complex on the edge of Galveston Bay. With a capacity 593,000 barrels per day, it was the second-largest petroleum refinery in Texas and third-largest in the United States circa 2008, and the eighth largest refinery in the world circa 2018.

The refinery was established 1931 as Republic Oil refinery.

In 2021, it was the greatest emitter of the carcinogen benzene into the United States environment, among all refineries in the country.

References

Sources

Further reading

1931 establishments in Texas
Oil refineries in Texas
Energy infrastructure completed in 1931
Texas City, Texas
Buildings and structures in Galveston County, Texas